Hadyn Paul "Teddy" Evans (born 15 October 1962) is a Norfolk Island businessman, actor and local government politician. He is also an international lawn bowler.

Biography
Evans was born in Hamilton, New Zealand, as an "eighth-generation descendant of the Bounty mutineers". He was educated at the Norfolk Island Central School. Evans runs a boutique piggery and market garden in Anson Bay. He took up acting relatively late in life and has appeared in a number of theatre productions both on the island and in mainland Australia. In March 2013, Evans was elected to the Norfolk Legislative Assembly as an independent candidate. He remained a member until the assembly's abolition in June 2015.

Lawn bowls
Evans is a lawn bowls player, and was selected as part of the Norfolk Island team for the 2018 Commonwealth Games on the Gold Coast in Queensland. He won a bronze medal in the Triples with Phillip Jones and Ryan Dixon. He was also given the honour of being the Norfolk Island flag bearer at the opening ceremony.

In 2020 he was selected for the 2020 World Outdoor Bowls Championship in Australia. In 2022, he competed in the men's triples and the men's fours at the 2022 Commonwealth Games.

References

1962 births
Living people
Bowls players at the 2018 Commonwealth Games
Bowls players at the 2022 Commonwealth Games
Commonwealth Games medallists in lawn bowls
Members of the Norfolk Legislative Assembly
Norfolk Island sportspeople
New Zealand male bowls players
Commonwealth Games bronze medallists for Norfolk Island
Norfolk Island bowls players
Medallists at the 2018 Commonwealth Games